Verheijen is a Dutch toponymic surname. It is a contraction of the surname Van der Heijden, meaning "from the heath". People with this surname include:

Carl Verheijen (born 1975), Dutch speed skater, son of Eddy
Eddy Verheijen (born 1946), Dutch speed skater, father of Carl
  (1778–1846), Dutch painter
Jan Verheijen (1896–1973), Dutch weightlifter
Mark Verheijen (born 1976), Dutch politician
Raymond Verheijen (born 1971), Dutch football coach
Yasmin Verheijen (born 1994), Dutch designer, model and beauty pageant

See also
 Verheyen, a common spelling variant

Dutch-language surnames